Solitary Rocks is a mass of rocks immediately northwest of Cavendish Icefalls on the north side of the major bend in Taylor Glacier in Victoria Land. The highest point is Pandora Spire. The descriptive name was given by the Discovery expedition, 1901–04.

Rock formations of Victoria Land
McMurdo Dry Valleys